South Acre is a village and civil parish in the English county of Norfolk. The River Nar flows between South Acre and Castle Acre.

The villages name means 'cultivated land'. 'South' to distinguish from Castle Acre.

In 1441 the village was the scene of the attempted murder of an important member of the local gentry, Sir Geoffrey Harsyk. A gang of local yeomen and labourers occupied the main road, preventing passage along it, singing "we are Robbynhodesmen, war war war". This was a direct reference to the legends of Robin Hood that were particularly popular in Norfolk in the fifteenth century, and, indeed, it is probable that events such as this fed directly into later versions of the tales.

For the purposes of local government, the parish falls within the district of Breckland.

Notes

External links

Information from Genuki Norfolk on South Acre.
http://kepn.nottingham.ac.uk/map/place/Norfolk/South%20Acre

Villages in Norfolk
Civil parishes in Norfolk
Breckland District